The Bistricioara is a right tributary of the river Bistrița in Romania, which it joins at the upper end of Lake Izvorul Muntelui, near the village Bistricioara. It flows through the villages Bilbor, Capu Corbului, Corbu, Tulgheș, Bradu, Grințieș and Bistricioara. Upstream from its confluence with the Borcut, it is also called Răcila.

Tributaries

The following rivers are tributaries to the river Bistricioara:

Left: Iutași, Vaman, Țigan, Pintii, Argestru, Hărlagii, Muncel, Seaca, Barasău, Prisăcani, Bradu, Grasu, Grințieș, Grințieșul Mic
Right: Borcut, Dobreanu, Fundoaia, Șeștini, Răchitișul Mic, Răchitișul Mare, Cupele, Pârâul Vinului, Corbu, Asod, Putna, Pintic, Frasin, Moraru

References

Rivers of Romania
Rivers of Harghita County
Rivers of Neamț County